The Casino Regulatory Authority of Singapore (CRA) was a statutory board under the Ministry of Home Affairs of the Government of Singapore. It was formed on 2 April 2008 to regulate the management and operation of the casinos in Singapore.

The CRA is responsible for ensuring that the management and operation of the casinos in Singapore remains free from criminal influence or exploitation. It also ensures that gaming in a casino is conducted honestly, and that casinos do not cause harm to minors, vulnerable persons and society at large.

On 1 August 2022, it was reconstituted to form the Gambling Regulatory Authority of Singapore.

Enforcement Actions
In 2017, the CRA imposed financial penalties of SGD$60,000 on the two casino operators for lapses in their security screening.

Marina Bay Sands was fined SGD$5,000 for failure to prevent one permanent resident from entering or remaining on its casino premises without a valid entry levy.

Resorts World Sentosa was fined SGD$55,000 for failures to prevent three minors and one excluded person gaining access to the casino floor.

Under the Casino Control Act, an entry levy is chargeable to Singapore citizens or permanent residents wishing to enter the casino area of each resort.

All patrons must also be aged 21 or over in order to gamble legally in its casinos.

See also
Gambling in Singapore
Marina Bay Sands
Resorts World Sentosa

References

External links
 Casino Regulatory Authority, Singapore
 Casino Control Act, Singapore

2008 establishments in Singapore
Government agencies established in 2008
2022 disestablishments in Singapore
Statutory boards of the Singapore Government
Regulation in Singapore
Gambling in Singapore